Methiola is a genus of methiolas in the family Acrididae. There is at least one described species in Methiola, M. picta, found in Australia.

References

External links

 

Acrididae